The 1973 World Series of Poker (WSOP) was a series of poker tournaments held at Binion's Horseshoe. The 1973 series marked the first time a single player won more than one preliminary World Series of Poker event.

Preliminary events

Main Event

There were 13 entrants to the main event. Each paid $10K to enter the winner-take-all tournament.

Final table

External links
Official site
YouTube video of the 1973 Main Event

World Series of Poker
World Series of Poker